The Autovía A-64 is a highway in Spain.  It connects the Autovía A-64 junction 367 km with Oviedo.

It heads south east through the Tunnel Fabares, then meets the N-634 before heading west to Oviedo and ending at the Autovía A-66.

The highway supports an average traffic of around 35,000 vehicles per day.

References 

A-64
A-64